The Low-Level Radioactive Waste Storage Site, formerly Lanyu Storage Site, is a facility to store all of the nuclear waste produced by three nuclear power plants in the Republic of China in Lanyu Island, Taitung County. It is owned and operated by Taipower.

History
In the early 1970s, the Atomic Energy Council (AEC) formed a task group to search for sites as a temporary storage facility for mid and low-level nuclear waste. The decision to choose Long Men area of Lanyu Island as the storage site was made in 1974. The Executive Yuan (EY) approved the construction plan of the site at the end of 1975. The construction of the facility commenced by building a harbor in 1978 and later the storage in 1980 named Lanyu Storage Site. The site was then managed by Office of Radioactive Waste Management of AEC. First shipment carrying nuclear waste arrived in May 1982. After accepting 97,672 low-level radioactive waste drums, it stopped accepting the waste in February 1996, in which 86,380 drums came from nuclear power plants around Taiwan and 11,292 drums came from various sources. In July 1990, Taiwan Power Company took over the management of the site according to the Radwaste Management Policy issued by EY. On 19 June 2018, the site was renamed Low-Level Radioactive Waste Storage Site.

Location
The facility was built at the South Eastern tip of Lanyu Island. It faces the Pacific Ocean in one direction, and the other three directions face hills behind it, thus separating the facility from the residence by natural barriers.

Design
The layout of the storage trenches was designed to the surrounding topography and ground water table. The height of the trench is 4.5 meters, with 3 meters underground and 1.5 meter above the ground. At the bottom of the trench, 5 cm of concrete and 40 cm of reinforced concrete were laid in sequence.

Functions
The facility receives low-level radioactive solid waste from nuclear power plants, medical, agriculture, industrial, education and research sectors about 45,000 barrels annually, which is being shipped by boat from Taiwan Island every week.

Safety
Taipower claims that several safety measures are taken to ensure the safety of the facility. Wastes are tested and examined before being stored at the facility, transportation and storage are done under strict control, thorough investigation and examination are done to the environment surrounding the facility, and changes in the radioactivity level are strictly monitored.

See also

 List of power stations in Taiwan
 Nuclear power in Taiwan

References

1980 establishments in Taiwan
Buildings and structures in Taitung County
Energy infrastructure completed in 1980
Nuclear power in Taiwan
Radioactive waste repositories